The Old City Hall at Gammeltorv Aalborg, Denmark, was built in 1762 and served as city hall until 1912. It is located at Gammeltorv and is now only used for ceremonial and representative purposes.

Building
The city hall was built by master builder Daniel Popp, who had moved to Aalborg from Copenhagen, and was modelled on Johan Conrad Ernst's City Hall there, which was later completely destroyed in the Copenhagen Fire of 1795.  This was a specific requirement from Iver Holck, the county governor (amtmand) at Aalborghus.

Designed in the Late Baroque style, the building consists of two storeys and a cellar under a black-glazed tile roof. The yellow-washed facade is decorated with white pilasters and a frontispiece featuring the Danish coat of arms and a bust of King Frederick V. His motto, Prudentia et Constantia, is also seen above the main entrance. The well-preserved door is a local example of the Rococo style. The building was listed by the Danish Heritage Agency in 1918.

Current use
The Old City Hall is today only used for wedding ceremonies and representative purposes.

References

External links

Government buildings completed in 1762
City and town halls in Denmark
Buildings and structures in Aalborg
Listed buildings and structures in Aalborg Municipality
Listed city and town halls in Denmark
Rococo architecture in Denmark
1762 establishments in Denmark
1912 disestablishments in Denmark
Former seats of local government